John Lowe (6 August 1912 – 16 August 1995) was a footballer and manager for Hamilton Academical.

Playing career
Lowe, a centre-half, signed for Hamilton Academical in August 1935 from Royal Albert. He also played for Galston, and Clyde. He scored on his debut for Accies in January 1936 against Airdrieonians. Hamilton finished sixth in the First Division in 1935–36, eighth in 1936–37, 13th in 1937–38, and seventh in 1938–39.

Lowe served with the Royal Air Force during the Second World War. He was also a member of the Tommy Walker XI Touring Team which toured India and Ceylon in 1945. Hamilton allowed Lowe to sign for Blackpool in 1940 as he was stationed there. In April 1945 he also guested for Port Vale, where he played two games. He also guested for Wolverhampton Wanderers and Aberdeen.

Management career
Lowe became Hamilton's Club Secretary in 1951 and was appointed as assistant manager at Douglas Park in 1953. He became manager in 1956 after replacing former teammate Jacky Cox. He led the Second Division club to 11th and 10th place in 1956–57 and 1957–58. However, he resigned from the position in 1958, and was replaced by Andy Paton.

Later life
After retiring from football, Lowe ran a fruit merchants business in Hamilton. At the time of his death, on 16 August 1995, he was residing in Lochranza on the Isle of Arran.

Career statistics
Player

Manager

References

1912 births
1995 deaths
Footballers from South Lanarkshire
Sportspeople from Cambuslang
Scottish footballers
Association football central defenders
Royal Albert F.C. players
Hamilton Academical F.C. players
Clyde F.C. players
Blackpool F.C. wartime guest players
Port Vale F.C. wartime guest players
Stockport County F.C. wartime guest players
Wolverhampton Wanderers F.C. wartime guest players
Aberdeen F.C. wartime guest players
Scottish Football League players
Royal Air Force personnel of World War II
Association football coaches
Scottish football managers
Hamilton Academical F.C. managers
Scottish Football League managers
People associated with Scottish islands
Hamilton Academical F.C. non-playing staff